Donna Lucey is the author of the book Photographing Montana 1894-1928: The Life and Work of Evelyn Cameron (1990), a biography and collection of photographs from frontier photographer Evelyn Cameron. Lucey has been an editor at Time-Life Books and Look magazine, and has received two grants from the National Endowment for the Humanities for her work on Photographing Montana. She lives with her husband Henry Wiencek and their son in Charlottesville, Virginia.

References

External links
 Interview with Donna Lucey
 Montana Historical Society
 https://donnalucey.squarespace.com/about-1/

Living people
Writers from Charlottesville, Virginia
20th-century American women writers
20th-century American non-fiction writers
People from Prairie County, Montana
American women non-fiction writers
Writers from Montana
21st-century American women writers
21st-century American non-fiction writers
Year of birth missing (living people)